Devli Kalan is a village in Nawa Tehsil in Nagaur District of Rajasthan State, India. It belongs to Ajmer Division . It is located 176 km towards East from District headquarters Nagaur, 60 km from State capital Jaipur. Devli Kalan Pin code is 341507 and postal head office is Maroth . Renwal, Jaipur, Sambhar , Phulera , Reengus are the nearby Cities to Devli Kalan. Minda ( 7 km ), Loonwa ( 10 km ), Shyamgarh ( 13 km )& KANCHANPURA 1.5 km are the nearby Villages to Devli Kalan. As per constitution of India and Panchyati Raaj Act, Devli Kalan village is administrated by Sarpanch (Head of Village) who is elected representative of village.

Population 

The Devli Kalan village has total 641 families residing with population of 3361 of which 1721 are males while 1640 are females as per Population Census 2011. In Devli Kalan village population of children with age 0-6 is 421 which makes up 12.53% of total population of village. Average Sex Ratio of Devli Kalan village is 953 which is higher than Rajasthan state average of 928. Child Sex Ratio for the Deoli Kalan as per census is 871, lower than Rajasthan average of 888.

Devli Kalan village has higher literacy rate compared to Rajasthan. In 2011, literacy rate of Devli Kalan village was 67.69% compared to 66.11% of Rajasthan. In Devli Kalan Male literacy stands at 82.35% while female literacy rate was 52.49%.

Work Profile 

In Devli Kalan village out of total population, 1353 were engaged in work activities. 82.93% of workers describe their work as Main Work (Employment or Earning more than 6 Months) while 17.07% were involved in Marginal activity providing livelihood for less than 6 months. Of 1353 workers engaged in Main Work, 714 were cultivators (owner or co-owner) while 100 were Agricultural labourer.

Nearby tehsils 

Devli Kalan is surrounded by Sambhar Tehsil towards South, Kuchaman Tehsil towards west, Govindgarh Tehsil towards East, Dudu Tehsil towards South.

Nearby railway stations 

Nearby railway station is Minda railway station which is in between Renwal and Bhainslana stations. This railway track starts from Delhi, Gurgaon, Rewari, Narnaul, Ringus, Renwal, Minda, Phulera and up to Ajmer. However, Jaipur Railway Station is major railway station 65 km near to Devli kalan.

Airports
Sanganeer Airport, Jaipur- 72 km
Indira Gandhi International Airport, Delhi- 266 km
Jodhpur Airport- 273 km

References 

Villages in Nagaur district